The 2019 V.League 2 (referred to as  LS V.League 2 for sponsorship reasons) was the 25th season of V.League 2, Vietnam's second tier professional football league. The season began on 5 April 2019 and finished on 5 October 2019. The season started with 12 clubs.

Changes from last season

Team changes
The following teams had changed division since the 2018 season.

To V.League 2
Promoted from 2018 Vietnamese National Football Second League
 Phố Hiến
 Phù Đổng
 An Giang
Relegated from 2018 V.League 1
 XSKT Cần Thơ

From V.League 2
Relegated to 2019 Vietnamese National Football Second League
 Công An Nhân DânPromoted to 2019 V.League 1
 Viettel

Rule changes
There is one direct promotion spot for the champion. The team finishing second will play a play-off match against the 13th-placed club of 2019 V.League 1. The club finishing last will be relegated to the 2020 Vietnamese National Football Second League

Name changes
In November 2018 Hà Nội B F.C. renamed as Hồng Lĩnh Hà Tĩnh

Teams

Stadiums and locations

Personnel and kits

League table

Results

Positions by round

Season progress

Attendances

By round

By club

Season statistics

Top scorers

Hattrick

See also
 2019 V.League 1
 2019 Vietnamese National Football Second League
 2019 Vietnamese National Football Third League

References

External links
Official Page

V.League 2
2019 in Vietnamese football